First Trust Building and Garage, also known as Lloyd's Bank, is a historic 1927 building located on Colorado Boulevard in Pasadena, California.  The building was designed by Cyril Bennett and Fitch Haskell; its design incorporates the Mediterranean Revival, Renaissance Revival, and Beaux-Arts styles. The design features decorative exterior stonework, a red tile hip roof topped with a cupola, and a frieze and balustrade on the south facade. The building's interior is decorated with murals depicting scenes from around Pasadena. Caltech professor R. R. Martel designed the building's earthquake-proof support system, which uses steel beams and girders with reinforcing concrete; the system was considered an important advancement in earthquake-proof construction and became a standard form of construction.

The First Trust Building and Garage was listed on the National Register of Historic Places in 1987.

References

External links

Buildings and structures in Pasadena, California
Buildings and structures on the National Register of Historic Places in Pasadena, California
Commercial buildings on the National Register of Historic Places in California
Renaissance Revival architecture in California
Mediterranean Revival architecture in California
Commercial buildings completed in 1927